Marilyn Berger Hewitt (born August 23, 1935), is an American broadcast and newspaper journalist and author. She worked for newspapers including The New York Times and The Washington Post, and hosted local television news programs in New York City.

Newspaper career
Berger worked as a foreign correspondent for Newsday on Long Island from 1965 to 1970. From there she moved on to The Washington Post, where she became a bit player in the Watergate Scandal. Berger reported that Richard Nixon White House staffer Ken Clawson had bragged to her about authoring the Canuck Letter, a forged letter to the editor of the Manchester Union Leader that played a large part in ending the campaign of Senator Edmund Muskie. She also reported on the Cold War arms race and China. She would later contribute to The New York Times.

Television
After leaving The Washington Post, Berger went to work for NBC News, where her duties included on-camera reporting at the 1976 Democratic and Republican National Conventions. She hosted the public television news program The Advocates, and was an anchor on the nightly news on public television station WNET in New York.

Author
In 2010 Berger wrote This is a Soul: The Mission of Rick Hodes, covering the journey of Dr. Rick Hodes into Africa to help sick children.

Personal life
Berger holds a bachelor's degree from Cornell University and master's degree from the Columbia School of Journalism. In April 1979 she married Don Hewitt, creator of 60 Minutes. They remained married until his death in August 2009. The couple had no children, but in 2009, right before Hewitt's death, they became the legal guardians of a boy from Ethiopia. Berger is the great aunt of Rob Fishman.

Recognition
Berger was honored at The New Jewish Home's Eight Over Eighty Gala in 2018.

References

American newspaper reporters and correspondents
American television reporters and correspondents
1935 births
Living people
American women television journalists
Columbia University Graduate School of Journalism alumni
20th-century American journalists
21st-century American journalists
Cornell University alumni
20th-century American women
21st-century American women